Benito Juárez (1806–1872) was a Mexican politician and lawyer who served 5 terms as president, notable for having defeated Maximilian I of Mexico and thwarting French rule.

Benito Juárez may also refer to:

Mexico
 Benito Juárez, Mexico City
 Benito Juárez Municipality, Guerrero
 Benito Juárez Municipality, Quintana Roo
 Benito Juárez Municipality, Sonora
 Benito Juárez, Veracruz
 Benito Juárez International Airport, Mexico City
 Benito Juárez Autonomous University of Oaxaca
 , a Reformador-class frigate of the Mexican Navy.

Argentina
 Benito Juárez Partido, Buenos Aires Province
 Benito Juárez, Buenos Aires, Buenos Aires Province
 Benito Juárez Airport (Argentina)

United States
 Benito Juarez Community Academy, Chicago, Illinois

Sculptures
 Statue of Benito Juárez (disambiguation)

Also see 
Benito Juarez (conductor) (1933-2020), Brazilian conductor
 Juárez (disambiguation)